Mount Ellsworth can refer to:
Mount Ellsworth (Antarctica), the highest peak in the Queen Maud Mountains in Antarctica
Mount Ellsworth (Montana), in Glacier National Park, Montana, United States
Mount Ellsworth (Utah), in the Henry Mountains, Utah, United States